Piyaziye(Persian:پیاز for "onion") are made of onion stuffed with meat (lamb) and rice. Piyaziye origins in 15th century Ottoman Empire.

See also

 List of stuffed dishes

References

Ottoman cuisine
Stuffed vegetable dishes
Turkish cuisine dolmas and sarmas